Charles Ribordy (24 October 1929 – 10 August 2000) was a Swiss fencer. He competed in the team épée event at the 1960 Summer Olympics.

References

External links
 

1929 births
2000 deaths
Swiss male fencers
Olympic fencers of Switzerland
Fencers at the 1960 Summer Olympics
People from Sion, Switzerland
Sportspeople from Valais